Samuel L. Myers Jr. (born 9 March 1949) is an American economist and Roy Wilkins Professor of Human Relations and Social Justice in the Hubert H. Humphrey School of Public Affairs at the University of Minnesota. He has been awarded the Samuel Z. Westerfield Jr., Award by the National Economic Association and the Marilyn J. Gittell Activist Scholar Award from the Urban Affairs Association (UAA) and SAGE Publishing.

Early life and education 

Myers was raised near the campus of Morgan State University, where his father, Samuel L. Myers Sr. was an economics professor.  He was born deaf, as was his mother and his maternal grandfather. Through his father, Myers Jr. is of Jamaican descent. He graduated from Morgan State and then did his doctoral work at the Massachusetts Institute of Technology.

Career 

Myers has taught at the University of Texas, Austin, University of Maryland, College Park, University of Pittsburgh and the University of Minnesota, and has been an economist with the Federal Trade Commission.  He has served as president of both the National Economic Association and the Association of Public Policy and Management.  He has authored or edited several books and dozens of papers using applied econometric techniques to study racial inequality in law enforcement, procurement and contracting, housing, faculty employment, food availability, family structure, and government aid.

Selected works 
 C Chung, SL Myers Jr. "Do the poor pay more for food? An analysis of grocery store availability and food price disparities" Journal of consumer affairs 33 (2), 276-296
 SL Myers Jr. "Estimating the economic model of crime: Employment versus punishment effects" The Quarterly Journal of Economics 98 (1), 157-166
 Darity Jr, William A., and Samuel L. Myers Jr. "persistent disparity." Books (1998).
 W Darity, SL Myers Jr "Changes in black family structure: Implications for welfare dependency" The American Economic Review 73 (2), 59-64
 SL Myers Jr, T Chan "Who benefits from minority business set‐asides? The case of New Jersey" Journal of Policy Analysis and Management 15 (2), 202-226

References 

African-American economists
Living people
1949 births
Morgan State University alumni
Massachusetts Institute of Technology alumni
American deaf people
21st-century American economists
Economists from Maryland
American people of Jamaican descent
21st-century African-American people
Presidents of the National Economic Association
20th-century African-American people